Ravyn Lenae Washington (born January 22, 1999) is an American R&B singer-songwriter from Chicago who is currently signed to Atlantic Records and the Three Twenty Three Music Group. She is also a member of the musical collective Zero Fatigue. Her debut EP, Moon Shoes, was released independently in 2015 and reissued by Atlantic Records in 2016. Her follow-up EP, Midnight Moonlight, was released in 2017. In addition to performing at several music festivals, Lenae has also toured with SZA on her Ctrl Tour and Noname on her Telefone Tour.

Early life and education

Ravyn Lenae Washington was born in Chicago, Illinois and raised as a member of the Pullman Christian Reformed Church on the far South Side of the city. Her grandfather, Richard Williams, served as the pastor of the congregation for 30 years. She credits her participation in worship at the church with helping to develop her interests and abilities in music. In middle school at Roseland Christian School, Lenae began writing her own songs. She would go on to attend the Chicago High School for the Arts where she studied classical music. She graduated from the school in May 2017 at 18 years of age.

Musical career

As a sophomore in high school, Lenae spent $300 for a studio session that would ultimately produce her first single, "Greetings." Soon after, in 2015, she was featured on Monte Booker's song, "Baby." Booker and Lenae along with rapper, Smino, formed the original core of the music collective, Zero Fatigue, which was brought together by Chris "Classick" Innumerable at his recording studio, Classick Studios. Lenae's first EP, Moon Shoes, was originally released as a free download in August 2015, but was later reissued by Atlantic Records and the Three Twenty Three Music Group in 2016. It drew praise from critics for her "fluid vocals and spare, poetic lyrics."

In 2016, Lenae was officially signed to Atlantic Records. She also appeared as a featured performer on Mick Jenkins' album The Healing Component and on Noname's song "Forever." She would go on to tour with and open for Noname on her Telefone Tour from January to March 2017. Lenae also performed at WBEZ's Winter Block Party alongside fellow members of the underground collective Medicine Woman: Drea Smith, Via Rosa, and Jean Deaux.

She released her second EP Midnight Moonlight on March 3, 2017. Later that month, she performed at SXSW, was featured on Smino's "Glass Flows," and was listed by Rolling Stone as one of "10 New Artists You Need to Know." In the following three months, she would go on to perform at several other festivals, including Mamby on the Beach in Chicago's Bronzeville neighborhood and Culture Shock in Purchase, New York. Beginning in August 2017, Lenae opened for SZA on her Ctrl Tour. The tour ended in December 2017. On February 9, she released her third EP, entirely produced by Steve Lacy, titled Crush.

On February 1, 2022, she released Skin Tight with Steve Lacy, the first single of her debut album, Hypnos. Following, she released her debut album on May 20, 2022. Featuring vocals and production from Monte Booker, Steve Lacy, Kaytranada, Fousheé, Mereba, Smino, Sango, Luke Titus, IAMNOBODI, Phoelix and Teo Halm. She announced a tour spanning 16 cities beginning at Neumos in Seattle, Washington. A special guest, Unusual Demont, will support the tour.

Artistry
In Jeune Afrique, Eva Sauphie described Lenae as a "cross between Kelela, an Azealia Banks dipped in honey and a teen spirit version Kelis," combining genres including "nu soul, electro-jazz, chamber pop, and ambient hip-hop." The Austin American-Statesman described her style as "a watercolor R&B platter with startling depth." Lenae has mentioned OutKast, Timbaland, Eminem, India.Arie, and Erykah Badu among her musical influences. Writing for Pitchfork, Ryan Dombal reviewed Lenae's performance on Monte Booker's "Baby" as "channel[ing] both Billie [Holiday] and Erykah [Badu] on the acoustic-guitar ballad, which crackles like Lauryn Hill's Unplugged as remixed by the ghost of J Dilla."

Comparing Lenae's two EPs, Mosi Reeves of Rolling Stone said Midnight Moonlight "delves into more romantic concerns with the same quiet grace" first heard on Moon Shoes in which she "sings about life as a dreamy, sometimes-melancholy teenager in a softly assertive voice." Marcus J. Moore's Pitchfork review of Midnight Moonlight noted that it "carries a methodical late-night vibe suitable for Quiet Storm radio" particularly when compared to the "far brighter" energy on Moon Shoes.

Discography

Studio albums

Extended plays

References

External links
 Official website
 Interview with Ravyn Lenae on WGN Radio

Living people
Musicians from Chicago
American contemporary R&B singers
American neo soul singers
21st-century American women singers
1999 births
African-American women singer-songwriters
21st-century American singers
American rhythm and blues singer-songwriters
21st-century African-American women singers
Singer-songwriters from Illinois